The Miss Montana USA competition is the pageant that selects the representative for the state of Montana in the Miss USA pageant. From 1994 to 2007, it was directed by Carol Hirata and the Carlton Group, based in Bellvue, Colorado. In 2013, it was taken by Pageants NW Productions based in Puyallup, Washington.

Sharon D. Tietjen placed in the Top 15 in 1958, having the longest streak failing to place in the finals, the record had been broken in 2022, where it was previously recorded by Delaware. Miss Montana USA 2005 Amanda Kimmel was chosen to represent the United States in the 2005 Miss Earth pageant. Although she did not place at Miss USA, Kimmel finished in the Top 8 at Miss Earth and was later selected to participate in Survivor: China, Survivor: Micronesia and Survivor: Heroes vs. Villains.

Heather Lee O'Keefe, a native of Wheeling, West Virginia who resides in Bozeman was crowned Miss Montana USA 2022 on September 12, 2021 at Red Lion Hotel Templin's on the River in Post Falls, Idaho. O'Keefe represented Montana for the title of Miss USA 2022.

Gallery of winners

Results summary

Placements
Top 10: Valerie Jackson (1952)
Top 15/20: Dawn Oney (1954), Sharon D. Tietjen (1958)

Montana holds a record of 3 placements at Miss USA.

Awards
Miss Congeniality: Robbin English (1980), Meredith McCannel (2002), Stephanie Trudeau (2007)

Winners 
Color key

1 Age at the time of the Miss USA pageant

References

External links

Official Website

Montana
Montana culture
Women in Montana
Recurring events established in 1952
1952 establishments in Montana